La Peña may refer to:

Places
La Peña, Bilbao, borough of the city of Bilbao, Spain
La Peña, Cundinamarca, village in the Cundinamarca department of Colombia
La Peña, Salamanca, village in the Salamanca province of Spain
La Peña, Panama

People with the surname, La Peña, La Pena or LaPena 
Frank LaPena (1937–2019), Nomtipom-Wintu American Indian painter, printmaker, ethnographer, professor, ceremonial dancer, poet, and writer.
Juan Manuel de la Peña Bonifaz (died 1669), Spanish politician, ad interim governor and captain-general of the Philippines in 1668-1669
Manuel la Peña (fl. 1808–1811), Spanish military officer who served during the Peninsular War
Manuel de la Peña y Peña (1789–1850), Mexican politician and lawyer, short lived interim president of Mexico in 1847 and president during the course of 1848

Other
La Peña Cultural Center, Chilean-American culture center in the United States
La Peña Sporting, Peruvian football club